The nuclear magneton (symbol μ) is a physical constant of magnetic moment, defined in SI units by:

and in Gaussian CGS units by:

where:
e is the elementary charge,
ħ is the reduced Planck constant,
m is the proton rest mass, and
c is the speed of light

In SI units, its value is approximately: 
μ =  
In Gaussian CGS units, its value can be given in convenient units as
μ = 

The nuclear magneton is the natural unit for expressing magnetic dipole moments of heavy particles such as nucleons and atomic nuclei.

Due to the fact that neutrons and protons consist of quarks and thus are not really Dirac particles, their magnetic moments differ from μ:

The magnetic dipole moment of the electron, which is much larger as a consequence of much larger charge-to-mass ratio, is usually expressed in units of the Bohr magneton, which is calculated in the same fashion using the electron mass. The result is larger than μ by a factor equal to the ratio of the proton to electron mass, or about a factor of 1836.

See also
 Nucleon magnetic moment

References

External links
.The link contains a troublesome vertical bar; if it does not work properly try the link’s parent page and select nuclear magneton from the displayed list.

Magnetism